Syver Aas (born 15 January 2004) is a Norwegian footballer who currently plays for Odds BK.

References

2004 births
Living people
Sportspeople from Skien
Norwegian footballers
Eliteserien players
Odds BK players
Norway youth international footballers
Association football forwards